Leon Edward Butler (December 2, 1892 – June 15, 1973) was an American rower who competed in the 1924 Summer Olympics. In 1924 he was a member of the American boat, which won the bronze medal in the coxed pairs.

References

External links
Leon Butler's profile at databaseOlympics
Leon Butler's profile at Sports Reference.com

1892 births
1973 deaths
Olympic bronze medalists for the United States in rowing
Rowers at the 1924 Summer Olympics
American male rowers
Medalists at the 1924 Summer Olympics